The original Omaha Public Library building was built in 1891 at 1823 Harney Street in downtown Omaha, Nebraska by renowned architect Thomas Kimball. Designed in the Second Renaissance Revival style, the building was designated an Omaha Landmark in October 1978, and was listed on the National Register of Historic Places that same year.

About
Similar to the Boston Public Library, the original Omaha Public Library building is the best early Second Renaissance Revival structure in Nebraska. Byron Reed, a pioneer real estate broker in Omaha, donated the site for the building and his collection of books, manuscripts and coins.

The library closed on February 16, 1977. It was subsequently renovated as an office building called the "Omaha Library Plaza".

See also
 History of Omaha
 Omaha Public Library

References

External links

 Historical images - Nebraska Memories
 Historic photo

Library buildings completed in 1891
Libraries on the National Register of Historic Places in Nebraska
Libraries in Omaha, Nebraska
National Register of Historic Places in Omaha, Nebraska
History of Downtown Omaha, Nebraska
Thomas Rogers Kimball buildings
Public libraries in Nebraska
1891 establishments in Nebraska